Musoke is a surname. Notable people with the surname include:

Allan Musoke (born 1980), Ugandan rugby union player
Benjamin Musoke (born 1976), Ugandan cricketer
Deogratias Musoke (born 1949), Ugandan boxer
Elizabeth Musoke, Ugandan justice of the Court of Appeal of Uganda
Kintu Musoke, (born 1938), Ugandan politician
Nico Musoke (born 1986), Swedish mixed martial artist
Theresa Musoke (born 1945), Ugandan-Kenyan painter and visual artist
Damalie Nagitta-Musoke, Ugandan academic, dean and acting principal of the school of law at Makerere University, Uganda